Coma is a 1978 American mystery thriller film based on the 1977 novel of the same name by Robin Cook. The film rights were acquired by director Michael Crichton, and the movie was produced by Martin Erlichmann for Metro-Goldwyn-Mayer. The cast includes Geneviève Bujold, Michael Douglas, Elizabeth Ashley, Richard Widmark, and Rip Torn. Among the actors in smaller roles are Tom Selleck, Lois Chiles, and Ed Harris.

The story was adapted again into a two-part television miniseries broadcast in September 2012 on A&E television network.

Plot 
Dr. Susan Wheeler, a surgical resident at Boston Memorial Hospital, is devastated when her friend, Nancy Greenly, a young healthy woman, is left brain dead after undergoing a routine procedure there. Her suspicions are aroused when, soon after, another young and otherwise healthy patient also falls comatose during knee surgery.

Susan investigates and discovers that over the previous year an unusual number of other fit, young patients have suffered the same fate and that all surgeries took place in operating room #8. Those patients also had a tissue-type sample taken before being transferred to the Jefferson Institute, a remote care facility. Susan's physician boyfriend, Mark Bellows, believes it is merely coincidence.

Susan offends Chief of Anesthesiology, Dr. George, by asking to review the relevant patient charts. Increasingly isolated and under mounting pressure from superiors and colleagues, Susan also begins doubting Mark's trustworthiness. She visits the hospital morgue where a postmortem is being performed on Nancy, who has since died. Susan asks the pathologists on ways someone could deliberately be put into a coma without detection. One pathologist suggests carbon monoxide poisoning. Dr. Harris, the chief of surgery, has twice reproached Susan about her recent behavior and interaction with Dr. George. He warns that she could be dismissed and insists she speak with a psychiatrist as a condition of her staying on; he is sympathetic, however, and has her take the weekend off to cope with her grief and stress over Nancy's death. She and Mark spend a relaxing weekend at the seaside. While driving back to Boston, Susan sees a highway sign for the Jefferson Institute and wants to go there. Mark waits in the car while Susan enters the austere building. Nurse Emerson greets Susan and explains the facility is closed to visitors, but says there is a physicians' tour on Tuesday.  Soon after, Kelly, a hospital maintenance worker who tipped off Susan that her suspicions about OR #8 are correct, is fatally electrocuted by an unknown man. Based on his assertions, Susan searches in the hospital basement and finds a tank with a line leading from it, through the ventilation system, to OR #8.

The man who killed Kelly has been stalking Susan. Late one night, he attempts to attack her at the hospital. After a brief struggle, Susan barely escapes and traps him in the anatomy lab's cadaver cooler.

Susan joins the tour for what is apparently an advanced, low-cost care facility for comatose patients. She leaves the tour to secretly investigate the restricted areas. Susan discovers that the institute is a front for an international human organ black-market. Patients' organs are being sold to the highest bidder. Boston Memorial purposely induces comas in select patients whose organs match potential buyers. The patients are rendered brain-dead via carbon monoxide being pumped from a hidden tank in the basement to the anesthesia equipment in operating room #8. The line is controlled by a radio signal.

Jefferson security spot Susan on surveillance cameras, but she escapes atop an ambulance as it leaves the compound to transport harvested organs to the airport. Susan, believing Dr. George is the operation's mastermind, rushes to Dr. Harris to share what she has discovered. Dr. Harris offers Susan a drink, and she quickly becomes incapacitated and experiences severe abdominal pain mimicking appendicitis. Susan realizes she has been drugged and that "Dr. George" is actually Dr. George Harris. Susan, barely conscious, is rushed to surgery where Dr. Harris will perform an appendectomy. As Susan is prepped for surgery, staff inform Dr. Harris that OR #7 is ready. His vehement insistence on using OR #8 arouses Mark's suspicions. Mark locates the gas line going from the basement to OR 8 and destroys it. To Dr. Harris' shock, Susan awakens after surgery. Two police officers are waiting outside to arrest Dr. Harris.

Cast 
 Geneviève Bujold as Dr. Susan Wheeler, surgery resident at Boston Memorial Hospital
 Michael Douglas as Dr. Mark Bellows, surgery resident at Boston Memorial Hospital and Susan Wheeler's romantic partner
 Elizabeth Ashley as Mrs. Emerson, a nurse at the Jefferson Institute
 Rip Torn as Dr. George, chief of anesthesiology at Boston Memorial Hospital
 Richard Widmark as Dr. Harris, chief of surgery at Boston Memorial Hospital
 Lois Chiles as Nancy Greenly
 Hari Rhodes as Dr. Morelind, hospital psychiatrist at Boston Memorial Hospital
 Richard Doyle as Jim, a pathologist at Boston Memorial Hospital
 Lance LeGault as Vince, a truck driver
 Tom Selleck as surgery patient Sean Murphy
 Joanna Kerns as Diane
 Ed Harris as a pathology resident
 Alan Haufrect as Dr. Marcus
 Philip Baker Hall as a doctor (uncredited)

Production 
Michael Crichton was a friend of Cook. They met when Crichton was doing post-doctoral work in biology at La Jolla's Salk Institute and Cook was a Navy physician stationed at San Diego. Crichton described the film as like a "Western... if the doctors are the bad guys they are also the good guys." Crichton says that even though the lead in the book was a female the studio talked about getting Paul Newman to play it, but he fought it. "If a man had done the movie, it would be a much more conventional thing." Tom Selleck was cast in the film for his appearances in Salem cigarette advertisements.

Crichton, a graduate of Harvard Medical School, sought to avoid depicting graphic details of medical procedures in order to avoid frightening the audience away from seeking medical care.

Filming started on June 20, 1977 in Massachusetts. Shooting took place at Boston City Hospital and the University of Southern California's dissection room. The mysterious, Brutalist-style building that served as the film's "Jefferson Institute" was at the time of filming a regional headquarters of Xerox Corporation located in Lexington, Massachusetts. Filming also took place at the MBTA subway, Rockport, Marblehead, Los Angeles City Hall, Century City, and Culver City Studios.

The building used for the Jefferson Institute is located on 191 Spring Street in Lexington, Massachusetts. It is currently the offices of Mimecast.

Michael Douglas called the film "the first time I've been offered a project with a good story laid out well, a good cast, and a good director."  The film cost $4.1 million but this was off-set by a pre-sale to TV worth $3 million.

Reception 
Stanley Kauffmann of The New Republic wrote "Coma is a thriller, rotten; but it's really worse than that. It's a disgrace to the several physicians involved in it".

Despite Crichton's intentions against scaring audiences from hospitals, many physicians and hospital administrators claimed this occurred. Variety claimed that organ transplant donations dropped as a result of the film and that a hospital in Tampa had to remove the number "8" from the door to an operating room because of patient complaints.

The film currently sits at an 81% rating on Rotten Tomatoes, based on an aggregate of 27 reviews.

References

External links 

 
 
 

1978 films
1970s psychological thriller films
1970s science fiction horror films
1978 horror films
Metro-Goldwyn-Mayer films
Films set in Boston
Medical-themed films
Films directed by Michael Crichton
Films with screenplays by Michael Crichton
Films based on American novels
Films based on thriller novels
American science fiction horror films
Films about organ trafficking
Films scored by Jerry Goldsmith
Films shot in Massachusetts
Films shot in Boston
Films shot in Los Angeles
Films set in Massachusetts
1970s English-language films
1970s American films